Mark Ross, known as Munk or Munkimuk is a Sydney-based hip hop performer and music producer. He is known as The Grandfather of Indigenous Hip Hop and has been performing since 1984 as a breakdancer and rapping since 1988. He is known for his music production, MCíng, breakdancing, event hosting and radio broadcasting. He has also been quoted as an influence on quite a few Australian hip hop artists. He has been working in the music industry for 30 years and has mentored and produced countless artists and acts both in Australia and Asia.

In 2014 Mark Munk Ross was inducted into the National Indigenous Music Awards Hall Of Fame.

Munkimuk was the founding member of Deadly Award-winning group South West Syndicate. He then released a demo album in 2005. He raps in his language group Jardwadjali (from the Grampians in Victoria) as well as in English. He is also an accomplished freestyle MC and has toured internationally playing shows in Europe, Canada and USA. He has played hundreds of shows since 1989 including Big Day Out, Mumbai Festival, Yabun, The Deadlys, Corroboree 2000, Barunga Festival, AFL, NRL, Arafura Games, Sydney Writers Festival, NT Writers Festival, Carnivale, Stylin Up, Klub Koori and Vibe 3 on 3 Basketball and Hip Hop Events.

In 2006 Munkimuk was nominated for a Deadly in the category of Single Release of the Year for his song Dreamtime.
Another mix of the track Dreamtime features on 2009 compilation CD "Making Waves - Indigenous Hip Hop" released through Gadigal Music and ABC.
Munk in late 2012 began a new project named "Renegades Of Munk" and in 2014 released the debut self-titled album, featuring an array of guests including Midnight Oil's Rob Hirst, Anne Kirkpatrick, Eric Grothe Jnr, Wilma Reading, Warren H. Williams, Kutcha Edwards, Stiff Gins and a host of others.

In 2017 Munk became part of the reformed, new incarnation of South West Syndicate, after a 14 year hiatus. This led to the release of the 2019 single "Back Like A Boomerang", as well as recording the 2022 South West Syndicate album "Promised Land". Munk is also working on a set on solo EPs for release in 2023.

Munkimuk has also is well known for his production and recording, working with various artists over the last 15 years including Jimblah, L-FRESH the LION, Yothu Yindi, Nabarlek Band, Thirsty Merc, Grinspoon, Shellie Morris, Dukebox, Trindoe, Ebony Williams and many other groups and artists. He also plays bass, rhythm and lead guitar, keyboards and drums. He has his own studio and also is a producer/engineer at Gadigal Studios. Since 2013, Mark has been producing and co-writing songs throughout South East Asia, including three hit singles. These songs have a combined YouTube count of over 100 million views.

He has previously been a radio presenter on 93.7FM Koori Radio hosting Making Tracks, The Brekky Show, Funky Lunch and the Indij Hip Hop Show. Also, he has been a presenter on ABC Radio and Channel V, on TV. He won a CBAA Award in 2008 for Contribution to Local Music. Munk also had a segment on the Deadly Sounds program called Hip Hop Drop. In 2011, Munkimuk was nominated for a Deadly Award for Community Broadcaster of the Year.

Mark works around Australia on community educational hip-hop projects and has for many years including creating and working on events with Gadigal Information Service/Koori Radio, Vibe Australia, Jimmy Little Foundation, Australia Council, APRA, Moogahlin Performing Arts, Bankstown Youth Development Service, Blacktown Arts Centre and other organizations mentoring emerging artists.

Munkimuk has been breakdancing since 1983 and still is active.

Discography
Ten Years Too Late (2005 Demo)
"Renegades Of Munk" (2014) through Impossible Odds Records an MGM Distribution.

References

External links
 MySpace page
 

Australian hip hop musicians
Indigenous Australian musicians
Living people
Year of birth missing (living people)